Bronze Torso of Avalokiteshavara is a Srivijaya-era bronze torso depicting Avalokiteshvara, a Bodhisattava in Buddhism. It was discovered in Chaiya District, Surat Thani Province in southern Thailand and is currently in a collection of Bangkok National Museum. It is one of the most beautiful and most widely recognised sculptures of Avalokiteshavara in Thailand.

Design 

The torso depicts a humanoid figure slightly inclining with a round face and eyes looking downwards. The headwear was partially lost. The figure is decorated with prakham (beads), necklaces, and phahurat (upper-arm-wear). A cloth chiang ba can be founded put on one of the shoulder, decorated with a dear-headed yajyopavit beads.

The torso is identified as a work of Srivijaya art, influenced by post-Gupta-Pala art of India. It was possibly created somewhere in Chaiya or other towns within the Kingdom, spanning from modern-day Thailand to the Java island in Indonesia.

History

Discovery 
According to a letter written by Narisara Nuwattiwong, the torso was founded near an outer wall to the northeast. A historian Manit Valliphodom (มานิต วัลลิโภดม) suspected unidentified boxes drawn in the temple's map, near the Phra Sila Daeng Sam Ong vihāra, from the aforementioned letter to be the discovery location. Buddhadasa wrote that once Damrong Rajanubhab noticed the torso from his seat on the elephant, he "leaped and rushed for the statue before the elephant even stopped for him" and "took the statue up by himself". Once he presented it to King Chulalongkorn in Bangkok, the King "looked [at the torso] excitedly" and "said excitedly [to Damrong]; 'What, what, Damrong.'"

The torso was since located in the Grand Palace, Bangkok until King Prajadhipok gave it to the Bangkok National Museum.

Identification 
The Fine Arts Department hypothesised that the torso was the statue mentioned in Wat Sema Mueang inscription (the 23rd inscription) which was dated to 775 CE. The inscription describes the greatness of Srivijaya King Dharma Seta. One section of it cited that the king had built three prasats to enshrine and revere three Buddhist figures; one for the Gautama Buddha himself, and two for two Bodhisattavas: Vajrapānī (the one who holds a vajra), and Padmapānī (the one who holds a lotus). The torso was possibly be of the latter Bodhisattva, Padmapānī; also known as Avalokiteshvara and was widely revered in Mahāyāna and Vajrayāna sects of Buddhism prevalence in the area at the time.

Association with Buddhadasa 

An influential Thai Buddhist monk Buddhadasa is highly associated with this Avalokiteshvara torso. It is also the main symbol of his temple-park complex .

In 1943, Indapañño (ordaining name of Buddhadasa) was called in to meet Damrong Rajanubhab at Varadis Palace in Bangkok to discuss about archeological findings in Chaiya. Damrong presented the Avalokiteshvara torso to him for the first time. Indapañño looked at the torso "with bemusement" as he "had never seen such beautiful [Buddharupa] like this." The beauty of the torso turned his "chit calm", as the face of the torso was "overwhelmed with compassion (mettā)." Indapañño once wrote: 

It is often regarded that Indapañño's interest in archaeology and history of southern Thailand could be attributed to his initial impression with this torso. So much so that he was later appointed as the chief of the National Museum for Surat Thani Province. 

He ordered a monk Phra Kovid Khemānanda (พระโกวิท เขมานันทะ) to create a replica of the Avalokiteshvara torso to be placed in his Suan Mokkh He has the statue "...[to be] placed in an easily-noticed location [so that] whenever you have dukkha or krodha; looking at the Avalokiteshvara will help your mind to clear up." "Being used as such, looking at the face to make you pleasant," he added.

References 

Cultural heritage of Thailand
Srivijaya
Surat Thani province
Statues in Thailand
Bronze sculptures
1905 archaeological discoveries
Collections of the Bangkok National Museum